Telephone numbers in the Republic of Artsakh use several ranges owned by Armenia.

Format: +374 XX XXXXX

References

Nagorno-Karabakh Republic
Republic of Artsakh-related lists